Birdgirl may refer to:

Birdgirl, ornithologist Mya-Rose Craig
Bird Girl, the sculpture on the cover of the book Midnight in the Garden of Good and Evil
Birdgirl, a character in the Birdman and the Galaxy Trio children's animated series
Birdgirl (TV series), a spin-off of Harvey Birdman, Attorney at Law, an animated adult sitcom